National Highway 544DD, commonly called NH 544DD, is a national highway in India.  It is a secondary route of National Highway 44. NH-544DD traverses the states of Andhra Pradesh and Karnataka in India.

Route 
Anantpur, Rayadurg, Molkalmuru, Hanagal.

Junctions  

  Terminal near Anantpur.
  Terminal Hanagal near Molkalmuru.

See also 

 List of National Highways in India
 List of National Highways in India by state

References

External links 

 NH 544DD on OpenStreetMap

National highways in India
National Highways in Andhra Pradesh
National Highways in Karnataka